Devesh Chandra Thakur was born on 3 July 1953 in Sitamarhi, Bihar. He is the Chairman of Bihar Legislative Council. He was sworn in as chairman of Bihar Legislative Council on 25th August 2022. He has also served as a cabinet minister in Government of Bihar and Deputy leader of Janata Dal United in the Bihar Legislative Council Devesh Chandra Thakur is fourth time elected Member of Bihar Legislative Council from the Tirhut Graduate Constituency covering four districts namely Sitamarhi, Muzaffarpur, Vaisali and Sheohar. He completed his early education in Sitamarhi. Then he went to study in Sainik School in Pune and subsequently to Fergusson College in Pune. He obtained Bachelor of Law degree
from ILS Law College. In 2002, he contested the Legislative Council election from Tirhut Graduate Constituency as an independent candidate and won that election. In 2008, Thakur contested and won the Bihar Legislative Council elections from Tirhut Graduate seat again. He is considered an "Ajatshatru" of Tirhut politics because of his unending winning streak.

References 

1953 births
People from Sitamarhi district
Members of the Bihar Legislative Council
Sainik School alumni
Fergusson College alumni
Living people
Janata Dal (United) politicians